John Frances Cook Sr. (1810-1855) was a pastor and educator. He was the first African-American Presbyterian minister in Washington D.C. and the head of the District's Smothers School. John F. Cook School in Washington, D.C. was named in his honor.

Biography 
Cook was born in Washington, D.C. He was enslaved until age 16 when his aunt, Alethia Tanner, purchased his freedom.

Cook apprenticed as a shoemaker and became an assistant messenger for the United States Land Commissioner. Cook attended the Smothers School in Washington D.C.. In 1834, he succeeded John Prout as head of the Smothers School and renamed it Union Seminary.

In 1835, Cook served as secretary for the fifth Convention for the Improvement of the Free People of Colour in the United States. He left the Seminary for one year and opened a school in Columbia, Pennsylvania. He returned to the Seminary in 1836 and remained there for two decades.

In 1841, Cook was licensed as a preacher by the Presbytery of the District of Columbia. That same year, he co-founded the First Colored Presbyterian Church of Washington, D.C. He was ordained as a pastor in 1843 and served at his congregation until his death in 1855.

Legacy 
His son, John F. Cook, Jr., founded a Washington D.C. school and named it in his honor.

References 

African-American educators
19th-century American educators
Christian religious leaders
African-American Christian clergy
Educators from Washington, D.C.
Free Negroes
1810 births
1855 deaths